Katarzyna Snopko (born 11 August 1965) is a Polish gymnast. She competed in six events at the 1980 Summer Olympics.

References

1965 births
Living people
Polish female artistic gymnasts
Olympic gymnasts of Poland
Gymnasts at the 1980 Summer Olympics
Gymnasts from Warsaw